Basiglio is a comune (municipality) in the Metropolitan City of Milan in the Italian region Lombardy, located about  south of Milan. It is the richest municipality of Italy.

Basiglio borders the following municipalities: Zibido San Giacomo, Rozzano, Pieve Emanuele, Lacchiarella.

References

External links
 Official website
 Discussion Forum on Basiglio

Cities and towns in Lombardy